Edelestand Pontas du Méril (26 March 1801 – 24 May 1870) was a French medievalist and philologist.

Bibliography 

(Du Méril s’y livre à une revue très intéressante des curieuses coutumes qui existaient dans presque tous les diocèses et rendaient plus évidentes les intentions dramatiques du culte.)

1801 births
1870 deaths
19th-century French historians
French medievalists
French palaeographers
French philologists
Literary historians
French male non-fiction writers
19th-century French male writers